Fragilidium is a genus of dinoflagellates belonging to the family Pyrocystaceae.

Species:

Fragilidium duplocampanaeforme 
Fragilidium fissile 
Fragilidium heterolobum 
Fragilidium lacustre 
Fragilidium mexicanum 
Fragilidium subglobosum

References

Dinophyceae
Dinoflagellate genera